"Busy Bein' Born" is a song by Middle Class Rut from their 2010 album No Name No Color.  The song ranked #47 on Billboard Rock Songs and #29 on Billboard Alternative Songs in 2011.

Premise

The video details child kidnapping, forced child labor and a Fight Club for children.

Charts

References

Middle Class Rut songs
2010 songs